Li Jia (born September 1964) is a former Chinese politician, and Communist Party Secretary of Zhuhai, Guangdong province. He was dismissed from his position in March 2016 for investigation by the Central Commission for Discipline Inspection.

Career
Li Jia was born in Xiangyin County, Hunan. He joined the Chinese Communist Party (CCP) in 1985 and graduated from the department of Electronics of Sun Yat-sen University. In 1994, Li served as Deputy Head of the CYLC Publicity Department of Guangdong and promoted to the post of head in 1996. In 2005 he became the mayor of Meizhou and promoted to the post of mayor in 2007. Li became the Communist Party Secretary of Meizhou in 2010 and transfer to Zhuhai in 2012.

Downfall
On March 23, 2016, Li Jia was placed under investigation by the Central Commission for Discipline Inspection, the CCP's internal disciplinary body, for "serious violations of regulations".

On March 8, 2017, he was expelled from the CCP and removed from public office.

On January 12, 2018, Li was sentenced to 13 years in prison and fined two million yuan for taking bribes worth 20.58 million yuan by the Intermediate People's Court in Zhangzhou.

References

1964 births
Chinese Communist Party politicians from Hunan
People's Republic of China politicians from Hunan
Political office-holders in Guangdong
Sun Yat-sen University alumni
Living people
Politicians from Yueyang
Expelled members of the Chinese Communist Party